William Wood (born 1900, date of death unknown) was a footballer who played in the Football League for Aberdare Athletic and Stoke. He was born in Stoke-on-Trent, England.

Career statistics

References

English footballers
Aberdare Athletic F.C. players
Stoke City F.C. players
English Football League players
1900 births
Year of death missing
Association football outside forwards